The Tianshengqiao-I Dam (locally abbreviated as TSQ-I) is a concrete face rock-fill embankment dam and hydroelectric power station on the Nanpan River straddling the border between Guizhou and Guangxi, People's Republic of China, located in the counties of Anlong and Longlin. Water released from the dam also powers Tianshengqiao-II Dam (TSQ-II) downstream. The power is transmitted to Guangzhou via HVDC Tian-Guang and an AC powerline.

See also 

 List of conventional hydroelectric power stations
 List of power stations in China

References

External links 
 TSQ-I Power station

Hydroelectric power stations in Guizhou
Hydroelectric power stations in Guangxi
Dams in China
Concrete-face rock-fill dams
Dams completed in 2000